Luis Miguel Tour was a concert tour performed by Luis Miguel to promote his album Luis Miguel. The tour was announced during a press conference from the Augustus Ballroom at Caesars Palace in Las Vegas on September 13, 2010. Pollstar ranked the tour at number five of the highest-grossing tours of 2011 in North America.

History
The tour began in Las Vegas with four concerts in celebration of the proclamation of independence of Mexico. Later, the tour continued to South America where he visited Peru, Chile, Argentina, Paraguay and Bolivia

In January 2011, Luis Miguel returned to the United States for six concerts in the following cities: San Diego, Palm Springs, Los Angeles and San Jose.

In February 2011, a season of concerts in Mexico began, with twenty concerts occurring at the National Auditorium. Luis Miguel then performed at cities including Guadalajara, Monterrey, Puebla, Leon, San Luis Potosí, Torreon, Querétaro, Veracruz and Tuxtla. Over in Central America, the tour came to Guatemala, Honduras and El Salvador. He returned to Mexico for a total of 41 concerts.

In May he opened another concert stage in the United States and Canada. The North American part of the tour took Luis Miguel to cities such as Miami, Orlando, Toronto, Chicago, Newark, Dallas, Tucson, El Paso, Albuquerque, Laredo, Hidalgo, San Antonio, Houston, Los Angeles, Fresno, Phoenix, and then close in Chula Vista, San Bernardino and Las Vegas. The Dominican Republic and Puerto Rico were also tour locations.

In February 2012 he began the celebration of 30 years of career with a concert in Punta del Este, and then participated in the "Viña del Mar International Song Festival" in Chile. Later, Luis Miguel opened the Mexico City Arena. He also visited Tampico and Monterrey.

In March he returned to Central America, particularly Costa Rica and Panama. Comes back to South America where he visited countries like Venezuela, Ecuador and Brazil (the latter not visited for 13 years).

In April he arrived in Spain for nine concerts, in cities such as Madrid, Barcelona, Seville, Malaga, Alicante, Palma, Caceres, and Santiago de Compostela.

Tour set list

Tour dates

The third Buenos Aires (2010) show was fully recorded for its transmission in Argentina by Telefe.
The Viña del Mar show was fully recorded for its transmission in Chile by Chilevisión.

Cancelled shows

Awards and records
 In October 2010, Miguel was recognized by the "Latino Awards 2010" as "Artist of the Century" in New York.
 In March 2011, Luis Miguel received a plaque for his 200 concerts at the National Auditorium in Mexico City (1991–2011).
 In October 2011, Miguel was proclaimed as the best Latin artist of the past 25 years, according to Billboard magazine.
 On February 22, 2012, at the "International Song Festival of Viña del Mar" Miguel was awarded 3 "Gulls" (gold, silver, platinum) and the keys to the city.

Band
Piano: Francisco Loyo
Acoustic & Electric Guitar: Todd Robinson
Bass: Lalo Carrillo
Keyboards & Programming: Salo Loyo
Drums: Victor Loyo
Percussion: Tommy Aros
Saxophone: Jeff Nathanson
Saxophone: Terry Landry
Saxophone: Albert Wing
Trumpet: Serafin Aguilar
Trumpet: Ramón Flores
Trumpet: Peter Olstad
Trombone: Alejandro Carballo
Trombone: Arturo Velasco
Backing Vocals: Kacee Clanton, Vie Le (2010–2011)

Notes

References

External links
 

Luis Miguel concert tours
2010 concert tours
2011 concert tours
2012 concert tours